In differential geometry, a Richmond surface is a minimal surface first described by Herbert William Richmond in 1904.  It is a family of surfaces with one planar end and one Enneper surface-like self-intersecting end.

It has Weierstrass–Enneper parameterization . This allows a parametrization based on a complex parameter as

The associate family of the surface is just the surface rotated around the z-axis.

Taking m = 2 a real parametric expression becomes:

References 

Minimal surfaces